Sankt Margarethen bei Knittelfeld is a municipality in the district of Murtal in Styria, Austria.

References

Cities and towns in Murtal District